Skyler Butts (born 18 September 1993) is a Hong Kong tennis player.

Butts has a career high ATP singles ranking of 1147 achieved on 27 November 2017. He also has a career high ATP doubles ranking of 1375 achieved on 27 November 2017.

Butts represents Hong Kong at the Davis Cup, where he has a W/L record of 1–0.

External links

1993 births
Living people
Hong Kong male tennis players
Sportspeople from Santa Ana, California
Sportspeople from Ocala, Florida
Tennis people from Florida